Saltovo is a rural locality (a selo) and the administrative center of Saltovskoye Rural Settlement, Staropoltavsky District, Volgograd Oblast, Russia. The population was 932 as of 2010. There are 10 streets.

Geography 
Saltovo is located in steppe, on Transvolga, on the bank of the Yeruslan River, 26 km northeast of Staraya Poltavka (the district's administrative centre) by road. Lyatoshinka is the nearest rural locality.

References 

Rural localities in Staropoltavsky District